Jaeger O'Meara (born 23 February 1994) is a professional Australian rules footballer playing for the Fremantle Football Club in the Australian Football League (AFL). He previously played for the Gold Coast Suns from 2013 to 2016, and the Hawthorn Football Club from 2017 to 2022. O'Meara won the AFL Rising Star award in his first season in 2013.

Early life
O'Meara was a former student of Nagle Catholic College in Geraldton. O'Meara began playing football for Railways Football Club in the Great Northern Football League. He competed for the Railways senior team in their 2010 GNFL Grand Final win and lined up on future Gold Coast Suns teammate Jack Martin. He was awarded the Guardian Medal for his best on ground performance at 16 years of age. O'Meara was then recruited by the Perth Football Club for the 2011 WAFL season and made his senior debut in August.

AFL career

Gold Coast (2013–2016)
Gold Coast obtained the first selection in the mini draft by trading their first selection, the fourth overall, to the new  team.

As part of the mini-draft rules, O'Meara was unable to play for the Gold Coast Suns in the 2012 season, but did play for them in the 2012 NAB Cup preseason competition and then with the reserve team in the North East Australian Football League. He underwent groin surgery that prevented him from playing for the rest of the season.

O'Meara made his debut in the opening round of the 2013 AFL season and was rewarded with the round 5 nomination for the 2013 AFL Rising Star after recording 25 disposals, five marks, four tackles and two goals in the forty-four point win against . He re-signed with the Suns for a further two seasons midway during the year. After playing every game for the Suns during his debut season, he was subsequently named the NAB AFL Rising Star for 2013. Since making his debut in 2013, O'Meara did not miss a game in 2013 and 2014, playing all possible 44 games during that period.

He had an unfortunate start to the 2015 season, as he injured his knee in a NEAFL scratch match that required extensive surgery. More surgery was required for his patella tendon that eventually resulted in him missing the entire 2015 and 2016 seasons through injury.

Hawthorn (2017–2022)
O'Meara requested a trade from Gold Coast in August 2016. In September, he nominated  as his preferred destination. He was officially traded to Hawthorn in October. O'Meara had an injury-plagued first season at Hawthorn, managing only six games due to ongoing knee problems. O'Meara's knee improved considerably by 2018, and he became a standard fixture in Hawthorn's midfield for that season and 2019. Due to Tom Mitchell's injury preventing him from participating in the latter season, O'Meara was widely seen as Hawthorn's most effective midfielder.

O'Meara was named as one of Hawthorn's two Vice-Captains prior to the 2020 season, along with Mitchell. O'Meara broke his hand in Round 12 of the season, causing him to miss four games.

Fremantle (2023–)
Despite being contracted to Hawthorn for a further year, O'Meara attracted interest from multiple clubs during the 2022 trade period, with interest from GWS and Fremantle, who were seeking a senior player to add to their lists.

Personal life 
O'Meara became engaged to Tory Packer in December 2022.

Statistics
Updated to the end of the 2022 season.

|-
| 2013 ||  || 1
| 22 || 16 || 11 || 231 || 245 || 476 || 97 || 111 || 0.7 || 0.5 || 10.5 || 11.1 || 21.6 || 4.4 || 5.0 || 4
|-
| 2014 ||  || 1
| 22 || 11 || 7 || 268 || 204 || 472 || 77 || 142 || 0.5 || 0.3 || 12.2 || 9.3 || 21.4 || 3.5 || 6.4 || 1
|-
| 2015 ||  || 1
| 0 || — || — || — || — || — || — || — || — || — || — || — || — || — || — || 0
|-
| 2016 ||  || 1
| 0 || — || — || — || — || — || — || — || — || — || — || — || — || — || — || 0
|-
| 2017 ||  || 10
| 6 || 1 || 4 || 41 || 88 || 129 || 12 || 24 || 0.2 || 0.7 || 6.8 || 14.7 || 21.5 || 2.0 || 4.0 || 1
|-
| 2018 ||  || 10
| 21 || 16 || 8 || 266 || 238 || 504 || 79 || 114 || 0.8 || 0.4 || 12.7 || 11.3 || 24.0 || 3.8 || 5.4 || 13
|-
| 2019 ||  || 10
| 21 || 8 || 11 || 327 || 215 || 542 || 76 || 123 || 0.4 || 0.5 || 15.6 || 10.2 || 25.8 || 3.6 || 5.9 || 11
|-
| 2020 ||  || 10
| 12 || 4 || 4 || 140 || 110 || 250 || 35 || 50 || 0.3 || 0.3 || 11.7 || 9.2 || 20.8 || 2.9 || 4.2 || 3
|-
| 2021 ||  || 10
| 18 || 5 || 9 || 232 || 241 || 473 || 74 || 91 || 0.3 || 0.5 || 12.9 || 13.4 || 26.3 || 4.1 || 5.1 || 11
|-
| 2022 ||  || 10
| 21 || 9 || 9 || 230 || 197 || 427 || 74 || 105 || 0.4 || 0.4 || 11.0 || 9.4 || 20.3 || 3.5 || 5.0 || 2
|- class=sortbottom
! colspan=3 | Career
! 143 !! 70 !! 63 !! 1735 !! 1538 !! 3273 !! 524 !! 760 !! 0.5 !! 0.4 !! 12.1 !! 10.8 !! 22.9 !! 3.7 !! 5.3 !! 46
|}

Notes

Honours and achievements
Individual
  vice-captain: 2020–2022
 Ron Evans Medal: 2013
 AFLPA best first year player: 2013
 AFLCA best young player of the year: 2014
 22under22 team: 2013
 Under 18 All-Australian team: 2011

References

External links

1994 births
Australian people of Irish descent
Australian rules footballers from Western Australia
Gold Coast Football Club players
Perth Football Club players
AFL Rising Star winners
People from Dongara, Western Australia
Living people
Hawthorn Football Club players
Box Hill Football Club players